Athagad (also spelt as Athgarh) is a town"(N.A.C)"  and a  sub-division of Cuttack district  in the state of Odisha, India.

Geography

History
During the British Raj, Athagad was the capital of the Athgarh State, one of the princely states of the Eastern States Agency. The Rajguru of Athgarh lived near Gada (rani mahal).

List of Rulers of Athgarh 

 1681 - 1709 Raja SriKaran Narayana Bawarta Patnaik
 1709 - 1741 Raja SriKaran Rama Krishna Bawarta Patnaik
 1741 - 1771 Raja SriKaran Debia Singh Bawarta Patnaik
 1771 - 1821 Raja SriKaran Gopinath Bawarta Patnaik
 1821 - 1825 Raja SriKaran Krishna Chandra Bawarta Patnaik
 1825 - 1837 Raja SriKaran Rama Chandra Bawarta Patnaik
 1837 - 1862 Raja SriKaran Bhubaneswar Bawarta Patnaik
 1862 - 1869 Raja SriKaran Jagannath Bawarta Patnaik II (d. 1869)
 1869 - 1893 Raja SriKaran Bhagirathi Bawarta Patnaik (b. c.1844 - d. 1893)
 1893 - 25 Jan 1896 Raja SriKaran Raghunath Bawarta Patnaik (b. 1865 - d. 1896)
 25 Jan 1896 - 22 Jun 1918 Raja SriKaran Vishvanath Bawarta Patnaik (b. 1885 - d. 1918)
 25 Jan 1896 - 1908 .... -Regent
 22 Jun 1918 - 15 Aug 1947 Raja SriKaran Radhanath Bawarta Patnaik (b.1909 - d.1983)
 23 Aug 1983 - 30 Jan 1990 Raja SriKaran Sankar Prasad Bewarta Patnaik (b. 1948 - d. 1990)
 30 Jan 1990 ( present ) Raja SriKaran Subhrapada Bewarta Patnaik (b. 1970- present)

Demographics
 India census, Athagad had a population of 15,850. Males constitute 51% of the population and females 49%. Athagad has an average literacy rate of 72%, higher than the national average of 59.5%; with 56% of the males and 44% of females literate. 11% of the population is under 6 years of age.

Blocks
 Athagad
 Baramba
 Tigiria
 Narasinghpur

Economy
Some large and medium scale industries have established their base in the area. Some of them are

T.S. Alloy

KVK Nilachal Power (P) Ltd.

Aarati steel

Maheswari Ispat Pvt Ltd

Pradhan Steel & Power Ltd

Amtek Metal &Mining Ltd

Visa Power

Arati Steel Ltd (power plant)

Famous Places
Dhabaleswar

Bhattarika Temple

Charchika Temple

Ansupa Lake

Politics
Current MLA from Athgarh Assembly Constituency is Ranendra Pratap Swain, who won the seat in State elections of 2004 and also in 2000 representing BJD and as a JD candidate in 1995 and 1990. Other previous MLAs from this seat were Janaki Ballabh Patnaik of INC who won this seat in 1985, Rasananda Sahoo of INC(I) in 1980, and Rasmanjari Devi of JNP in 1977.

Athgarh is part of Cuttack (Lok Sabha constituency).

See also
 Athgarh

References

Cities and towns in Cuttack district